Bei Bei (Chinese: t , s , p Bèibèi) is a male giant panda cub who was born and lived at the National Zoo in Washington, D.C., in the United States. He was part of US-China relations panda diplomacy, and was sent to the People's Republic of China on November 19, 2019 at the age of 4. He is currently at the Ya’an Bifengxia Base of the Giant Panda Conservation and Research Center in southwest Sichuan province. He is the brother of Tai Shan, Bao Bao, and Xiao Qi Ji.

Birth
Bei Bei was born on August 22, 2015 at 10:07 PM, together with a twin who was born at 5:35 PM that died from pneumonia 4 days after their birth. His mother is Mei Xiang. His father, via artificial insemination, is National Zoo panda Tian Tian. As of October 7, 2015 he weighed 5 lbs (1.8 kg). As of November 21, 2019, he weighed 240 pounds (108 kg).

Naming
On September 25, 2015, five weeks after the birth of the baby panda, he was named "Bei Bei" by Michelle Obama and Peng Liyuan, the first ladies of the United States and the People's Republic of China, respectively. The name was selected from a list of suggestions by officials from the National Zoo and the Wolong National Nature Reserve in China's Sichuan Province. The National Zoo preferred the name Ping Ping ("peace"), while "Bei Bei" was the staff choice at Wolong; doubled names are usually chosen because they are diminutive in Chinese. The first ladies revealed the name in both English and Mandarin, assisted by third-grade students from a Chinese-immersion elementary school in Washington, D.C. The name means "precious" or "treasure", the same as his 2-year-old sister Bao Bao. Zoo director Dennis Kelly admitted that the name is likely to give rise to jokes and wordplay linking the name to "baby".

Before the naming ceremony, Kelly said, "It's a very exciting day because it celebrates more than four decades of research and success on the giant panda, and to have it recognized by the two first ladies is an honor."

Move to China
Bei Bei made his first public viewing on January 16, 2016. After 3 and a half years viewed at the National Zoo in America, the panda was  sent to China to participate in a breeding program. On Tuesday, November 19, 2019, Bei Bei departed the National Zoo with veterinarian, Dr. Donald Neiffer, and his life-long keeper Laurie Thompson on the FedEx Panda Express to China. He landed in Chengdu, China on Wednesday, November 20, 2019, and spent 30 days in quarantine before moving to the Chengdu Panda bases.

In 2021 Bei Bei became the subject of a children's book titled Bei Bei Goes Home,  written by Cheryl Bardoe. The book describes his return from America to China and what that means for conservation efforts.

Adult Life
Bei Bei turned 6 years old in 2022. Giant Panda's achieve the age of sexual maturity between the ages of 4 and 8. It has been reported that upon reaching this milestone, he would become part of a breeding program credited with increasing panda populations until they could be removed from the endangered species list. Some scientists disagree with this assessment and assert that although the number of pandas in captive breeding programs like this one is growing, multiple threats to wild pandas still exist.

See also
 List of giant pandas

References

External links 

 National Zoo

Individual giant pandas
National Zoological Park (United States)
2015 animal births